"Racks" is the debut single by American rapper YC featuring fellow American rapper Future. Produced by Sonny Digital and Student, the song was released for digital download in the United States on April 5, 2011, and serves as a single for YC's debut mixtape Got Racks. The song also peaked at No. 42 on the US Billboard Hot 100 and stayed on the chart for 17 weeks.

Music video 
The music video for "Racks" was released on April 18, 2011 on Vevo. Sonny Digital, Gucci Mane, Young Scooter, Rocko, Slim Dunkin, Zaytoven, Mike Will Made-It, and Shawty Lo make cameo appearances.

Remix 

The official remix was released on May 20, 2011, and features rappers Young Jeezy, Wiz Khalifa, Waka Flocka Flame, B.o.B, Yo Gotti, Wale, Big Sean, Cory Gunz, Twista, Bun B, Dose, Cory Mo, Nelly, CyHi the Prynce, Trae and Ace Hood. The music video for the remix was released on June 28, 2011, and features Nelly, B.o.B, Trae tha Truth, Yo Gotti, CyHi the Prynce, Dose and Ace Hood.

Rapper Lil Wayne recorded a freestyle over the instrumental for his mixtape Sorry 4 the Wait. Lil' Kim also recorded a freestyle included on her mixtape Black Friday.

Lyrical content 
The lyrics make references to purple drank ("lean"), Xanax ("bars"), marijuana ("chron a.k.a. chronic"), cocaine ("yayo or white"), and MDMA ("bean").

Charts and certifications

Weekly charts

Year-end charts

Certifications

References 

2011 debut singles
Future (rapper) songs
American hip hop songs
YC (rapper) songs
Songs written by Sonny Digital
Songs written by Future (rapper)
2011 songs
Universal Motown Records singles